Miranda is a French Eurodance group, active in Europe in the late 1990s and early 2000s. The main frontwoman of the group was the French-Spanish singer and dancer Sandra Miranda García (born in Paris, France, on 24 January 1976). The band was initially signed to Universal Records.

History
In 1998, Miranda was taking part as a dancer to the videoclip of Ricky Martin's song, "María", when she met producers Louis Element and Johnny Williams. Their first release, in 1999, was the lead single from their first and only album Fiesta: "Vamos a la playa"; the song became a summer hit in the Netherlands and Italy. In 2000, they released two singles, "Eldorado" and "A la fiesta", the latter of which peaked at number 66 on the Dutch Singles Chart. They released one further song, the non-charting "Bamba! (El Ritmo De Miranda)".

In 2001, Miranda disbanded and main singer signed with the label "Do It Yourself" for a solo career.

Discography

Albums

Singles

References

French Eurodance groups
French people of Spanish descent
1976 births
Living people
21st-century French singers
21st-century French women singers